Low-dose naltrexone (LDN) describes the off-label, experimental use of the medication naltrexone at low doses for diseases such as Crohn's disease and multiple sclerosis, but evidence for recommending such use is lacking.

Naltrexone is typically prescribed for opioid dependence or alcohol dependence, as it is a strong opioid antagonist. It has been hypothesized that low-dose naltrexone might operate as an anti-inflammatory agent and therefore could be used to treat some chronic conditions involving immune system dysregulation.

Some proponents of low-dose naltrexone have promoted unproven claims about its efficacy in treating a wide range of diseases, including cancer, chronic fatigue syndrome and HIV/AIDS.

Mechanism of action

Action of naltrexone at normal dose 
Naltrexone and its active metabolite 6-β-naltrexol are competitive antagonists at μ-opioid and κ-opioid receptors, and to a lesser extent at δ-opioid receptors. Standard therapeutic doses of naltrexone block these receptors, which does two things; it prevents inhibition of GABA receptors (normally, signaling through the GABA receptors inhibits the activity of neurons; many recreational drugs inhibit GABA and thus "free up" neuronal activation; preventing inhibition of GABA allows GABA's normal inhibition activity to take place) and it blocks dopamine release (many recreational drugs stimulate dopamine release, which is part of the brain's reward system that creates pleasure).

Hypothesized action at low doses 
Low-dose naltrexone refers to doses about 1/10th the size of the dose used normally, typically 4.5 mg or within a couple of milligrams of that value. It is hypothesized that if there are any effects, low-dose naltrexone may inhibit opioid receptors and therefore cause the body to increase production of endorphins and upregulate the immune system; it may also antagonize Toll-like receptor 4 that are found on macrophages, including microglia, possibly resulting in the reported anti-inflammatory effects. Researchers have also examined "ultra-low-doses" of naltrexone at microgram, nanogram, and picogram doses, that are co-administered with opioid analgesics with the goal of increasing pain relief and reducing side effects.

Research
Multiple studies have been claimed to show that low-dose naltrexone has promise as a treatment for chronic pain, some autoimmune disorders and cancers. More research is needed.
As of 2014, no peer-reviewed studies supporting low-dose naltrexone for multiple sclerosis (MS) have been published. Prescription and medical formulation of low-dose naltrexone in the UK are unlicensed in the treatment of multiple sclerosis. Clinical trials for treatment of fibromyalgia were initiated in 2021.

Given its frequent promotion in difficult-to-treat syndromes, low-dose naltrexone is being studied in Long COVID. However, efficacy has not been shown.

In 2017, Raknes and Småbrekke published a drug utilization cohort study on Norwegian patient and prescriber characteristics, and dispense patterns, following a 2013 television documentary on low-dose naltrexone. They reported drawing upon the Norwegian Prescription Database and sales data not recorded in NorPD from the only Norwegian LDN manufacturer, with the caveat that these sources could not encompass the total. Their findings included that "Twenty percent of all doctors and 71% of general medicine practitioners registered in Norway in 2014 prescribed LDN at least once."

Criticisms
In addition to proposed uses for low-dose naltrexone that have been studied in clinical research, low-dose naltrexone advocates make claims of its efficacy in treating other conditions, including: various types of cancer, Alzheimer's disease, HIV/AIDS, rheumatoid arthritis, fibromyalgia, chronic fatigue, Hashimoto’s, and immunocompromised patients. In 2010, neurologist Steven Novella disputed cure-all claims about low-dose naltrexone as unsupported by rigorous clinical research, calling many applications pseudoscientific. 

More research will be needed to determine if low-dose naltrexone is useful for any health purpose. As the UK's National Health Service noted in 2020, "...trials are necessary to draw firm conclusions on the efficacy of [low-dose naltrexone]... However, there is little incentive for pharmaceutical companies to conduct this research as naltrexone is inexpensive and off-patent."

References

Opioid receptors

sv:Låg dos Naltrexon